Silo is a series of post-apocalyptic science fiction books by American writer Hugh Howey. The series started in 2011 with the short story "Wool", which was later published together with four sequel novellas as a novel with the same name. Along with Wool, the series consists of Shift, Dust, three short stories, and Wool: The Graphic Novel.

Background
Howey began the series in 2011, initially writing Wool as a stand-alone short story. He published the work through Amazon's Kindle Direct Publishing system, choosing to do so due to the freedom of self-publishing. After the series grew in popularity, he began to write more entries for it. Howey began soliciting international rights in 2012 and has since signed a deal for dramatic rights in Brazil. Film rights to the series were sold to 20th Century Fox; Lionsgate also expressed interest.

Howey signed a print-only deal for around $500,000 with Simon & Schuster to distribute Wool to book retailers across the US and Canada. Howey retains full rights to continue distributing Wool online himself.

Plot
The story of Wool takes place on a post-apocalyptic Earth. Humanity clings to survival in the Silo, a subterranean city extending 144 stories beneath the surface. The series initially follows the character of Holston, the sheriff of the Silo, with subsequent volumes focusing on the characters of Juliette, Jahns, and Marnes. An ongoing storyline of the series focuses on the mystery behind the Silo and its secrets. Shift encompasses books six through eight and comprises a prequel to the series. Book nine, Dust, pulls the storylines together.

Several studies frame the story within the dystopian genre since Howey includes several of the main features of that type of literature, i.e., a totalitarian rule, a rebellion of the main characters, or a planned separation between human areas and wild natural spaces.

Wool
The intro teaser for the book is: "If the lies don't kill you, the truth will."

Book 1 — Holston
Wool initially follows the story of Holston, the Silo's sheriff. All residents of the Silo have been taught that the outside world is toxic and deadly, and anyone who expresses any desire to go outside is sent to clean the external sensors. Those sent this way outdoors inevitably clean the sensors as instructed but die a few minutes later. Three years before the story's events, Holston's wife became convinced that the outside world was livable and that the IT department (which runs the external sensors) had deceived the rest of the silo. She went to clean willingly but apparently perished.

Three years later, still grieving the loss of his wife, Holston also asks to go outside. He is given a protective suit and sent outside, but when he exits the silo, he sees a healthy, vibrant world. Encouraged by this sight, he happily cleans the silo's external sensors and then explores the environment. However, he is forced to remove his helmet when he runs out of air, and at that point, he discovers that the world is actually toxic and his wife is dead. The suit's visor had been masking reality with a computer-generated image. Holston dies near his wife's abandoned body.

These events catalyze the remaining books.

Book 2 — Proper Gauge
A new sheriff is needed to replace the recently-deceased Holston. Mayor Jahns and Deputy Marnes embark on a trip to the Silo's lowest region to interview Juliette, their top candidate for sheriff. Along the way, they encounter various areas of the Silo, including the mysterious IT department. Bernard, the head of IT, demands his own preferred candidate for sheriff, but Jahns dismisses his concerns. Privately, Jahns also contemplates a relationship with Marnes.

Jahns and Marnes meet Juliette in the Machinery zone, the lowest level of the Silo. Juliette quickly proves herself to be responsible, stubborn, and independent, which impresses Jahns. After expressing some hesitation, Juliette agrees to take the job. On the return trip, Jahns and Marnes privately begin a romantic relationship.

Bernard is incensed to learn that Jahns has formally appointed Juliette to be the new sheriff, and he is likewise angry with Marnes for supporting this decision. Soon afterward, Jahns falls ill. In her final moments, she realizes she has consumed poison from Marnes's canteen. Bernard poisoned Marnes's canteen and hers.

Meanwhile, Juliette completes a vital maintenance project on the Silo's primary generator. She receives the news of the mayor's sudden death.

Books 3–5
The saga is continued in Casting Off. It runs through The Stranded as Juliette continues to explore the mysteries of the Silos, bringing her into contact with the head of IT and Lukas, a young astronomer and member of IT. The growing relationship between Lukas and Juliette serves as a backdrop for the remaining three novellas, as the mystery of the Silos is gradually revealed.

Shift
Book 6 — Legacy

First Shift is a prequel to the story in the first five Wool novels, where the actions that led to the world's status quo are explained through the eyes of Donald Keene, a young congressman, and Troy, a Silo chief.

Book 7 — Order

Second Shift follows a few of the characters of Book 6 when they are woken from cold-sleep 100 years later to be consulted on some unresolved problems, as well as a young character named Mission in Silo 18, where internal fighting threatens their survival….

Book 8 — Pact

Third Shift brings a close to the prequel trilogy. It tells the story of the fall of Silo 17 and the transformation of Jimmy into Solo, as well as the continued story of Donald Keene in Silo 1.

Dust
Book 9 — Dust

Dust is the third and final act in the Silo stories. It brings together the lives of Donald, Juliette, and the other people in Silo 18 and the survivors from Silo 17.

Unnamed future book
On August 15, 2021, Hugh Howey announced starting writing the next book in the Wool series, taking place in Silo 40.

Short stories
These are part of The Apocalypse Triptych collection of short stories. All three stories also appear in Howey's anthology Machine Learning.
 In the Air from The End is Nigh
 In the Mountains from The End is Now
 In the Woods from The End Has Come

Reception
A reviewer for Wired praised the omnibus, stating that it "clears away the grime of the past and reveals the new truth" about change in publishing.
Fans have been inspired to write their own scenes, chapters, and novels.

Adaptations

Film and television 
Since its initial publication, multiple attempts have been made to adapt the Wool series into a film or television series. Film rights for the story were sold in May 2012 to 20th Century Fox, and director Ridley Scott and Steve Zaillian were named as producers. This project never came to fruition due to the acquisition of 21st Century Fox by Disney. In July 2018, AMC announced LaToya Morgan would be adapting Wool for the network as a series. The series was later moved to Apple TV+. In May 2021, press releases were sent out stating that Graham Yost would write the series, Morten Tyldum would serve as director, and Rebecca Ferguson would star and serve as executive producer. Howey, Remi Aubuchon, Nina Jack, and Ingrid Escajeda also serve as executive producers. In August 2021, Tim Robbins joined the cast. Filming took place in Hoddesdon, Hertfordshire during late 2021 until spring 2022. The series had a projected release date of March 2023. March 2023 ads for Apple TV indicate a May 5, 2023 release date.

Comic book adaptation 
In July 2013, it was announced that Amazon's new comic book imprint Jet City Comics would be releasing a comic book adaptation of the series. Jimmy Palmiotti and Justin Gray will adapt the story, and Jimmy Broxton will create the artwork. On July 9, 2013, Howey released a preview of the comic book's cover on his blog. The graphic novel was published in August 2014.

Bibliography

Wool (July 30, 2011) 
Wool: Proper Gauge (November 30, 2011)
Wool: Casting Off (December 11, 2011)
Wool: The Unraveling (December 26, 2011)
Wool: The Stranded (January 25, 2012)
First Shift — Legacy (April 14, 2012)
Second Shift — Order (November 12, 2012)
Third Shift — Pact (January 24, 2013)
Dust (August 17, 2013) 
Wool Omnibus (2012, contains books 1-5) 
Shift Omnibus (2013, contains books 6-8)

References

External links
 

2012 American novels
2012 science fiction novels
American science fiction novels
Self-published books
Science fiction book series
Dystopian novels